The 2013–14 West Virginia Mountaineers women's basketball team will represent West Virginia University during the 2013–14 NCAA Division I women's basketball season. The Mountaineers are coached by thirteenth year head coach Mike Carey and play their home games at WVU Coliseum. They finished with a record of 30–5 overall, 16–2 in Big 12 play to share the Big 12 regular season champions with Baylor. They lost in the 2014 Big 12 women's basketball tournament to Baylor. They were invited to the 2014 NCAA Division I women's basketball tournament which they defeated Albany in the first round before losing to LSU in the second round.

Roster

Schedule and Results
Sources:

|-
!colspan=9 style="background:#FFC600; color:#000000;"| Exhibition

|-
!colspan=9 style="background:#FFC600; color:#000000;"| Non-Conference Games

|-
!colspan=9 style="background:#FFC600; color:#000000;"| Conference Games

|-
!colspan=9 style="background:#FFFFFF; color:#342A7B;"| 2014 Big 12 Conference women's basketball tournament

|-
!colspan=9 style="background:#FFFFFF; color:#342A7B;"| 2014 NCAA women's tournament

See also
 2013–14 West Virginia Mountaineers men's basketball team

References

West Virginia
West Virginia Mountaineers women's basketball
West Virginia
Mount
Mount